The SDC Championship is a professional golf tournament held at St Francis Links in St Francis Bay, South Africa.

The tournament was introduced for the 2023 season as a co-sanctioned European Tour and Sunshine Tour event.

Matthew Baldwin won the inaugural event, shooting 18 under par to win by seven shots ahead of Adri Arnaus.

Winners

Notes

References

External links
Coverage on European Tour official site

European Tour events
Sunshine Tour events
Golf tournaments in South Africa